Mordella moscoviensis is a species of beetle in the genus Mordella of the family Mordellidae, which is part of the superfamily Tenebrionoidea. It was discovered in 1921 and named after Moscow.

References

Beetles described in 1921
moscoviensis